Yeh Saali Aashiqui is an Indian Hindi-language romantic thriller film. The film is directed by Cherag Ruparel and produced by Jayantilal Gada & Amrish Puri Films.
The film stars debutantes Vardhan Puri, grandson of Amrish Puri, and Shivaleeka Oberoi.
The film was initially scheduled to be released on 22 November 2019. but later postponed by one week to 29 November 2019.

Plot 
Three years ago, Sahil Mehra and Mittee Deora meet in hotel management college in Shimla and fall in love. Due to Sahil's broken trust, they break up. He finds Mittee cheating in exams and complains it. Mittee's friend told her that Sahil complained it. Mittee asks Sahil for a last chance after she fakes fainting in her room. Sahil develops a cold shoulder and forgives her. Mittee hurts herself and then makes a scenario as if Sahil tried to rape her and tells this to her professor. Sahil is proved mentally ill and is sent to a mental hospital. when he was actually mentally fit.

In the present, Sahil has shown improvement and wants to get out but cannot. His identical twin brother, Surya Mehra, comes in to get some signatures from him. Sahil knocks down Surya and gets out. he starts searching for Mittee for Revenge. Mittee is now in a relation with Anuj Mathur. Then Sahil attacks her multiple times to scare her with the help of Mittee's friend Kavita. Anuj listens to her they go to the mental asylum to find Surya in it but they mistake Surya for Sahil. Anuj gets angry because of repeated sahil words from Mittee and warns her to take his name again. Sahil gets to know that Mittee and Anuj are getting engaged and will soon marry each other. He make a video and projects it on the engagement day. That video showcased how many more she cheated and their stories in their voices. Everyone gets to know about her real character and Anuj calls off the Engagement. Mittee's father gets an attack and her mother tells Mittee to go away from their life.

Sahil calls Mittee to the hospital where her parents were. they both have a huge tiff and Mittee runs around trying to shoot sahil but misses every time. She finally shoots Sahil in her parents room on the last bullet. Sahil was still breathing and Mittee took a huge cylinder and hit Sahil multiple times to kill him on the spot. Mittee's parent watch her kill Sahil. Police arrested Mittee and Sahil was pronounced dead. Mittee was given life sentence.

Surya comes to meet Mittee to thank her for killing Sahil. On the way back she heard the sound of whistle which she knew that only Sahil could play.  She realised that the one who died was actually Surya. Sahil got Surya out of mental asylum and told him to wait in Mittee's Parent's room. the one who came to meet Mittee was actually Sahil who hid after getting Mittee to chase him till her parents room and Mittee killed Surya thinking it was Sahil.

Cast
Vardhan Puri in a dual role as Sahil Mehra and Surya Mehra
 Shivaleeka Oberoi as Mitee Deora
 Ruslaan Mumtaz as Anuj Mathur
 Amit Arora as Priyank Sharma
 Jesse Lever as Venu
 Pulkit Bangia as Jehan Vevaina
 Deepansha Dhingra as Kavita Malhotra, Mitee's friend
 Jasvant Singh as Nanu
 Sanjeev Johri as Doctor Irani 
 Pankaj kumar as Student
 Yudhvir Dahiya as Doctor Jha
 Satish Kaushik as Chenu Babu (Cameo appearance)

Release
The official trailer of the film was unveiled by Pen India Limited on 5 November 2019.

Soundtrack

This music of the film is composed by Hitesh Modak with lyrics written by Tanveer Ghazi.

Accolades

References

External links
 
 
 

2010s Hindi-language films
2019 thriller drama films
2010s romantic thriller films
2019 films
Indian thriller drama films
Indian romantic thriller films
Indian films about revenge
Films about mental states